Lantau North Country Park is one of two rural parks on Lantau Island, Hong Kong and is located on the north side of the island. The  park was designated in 1978.

History
Lantau North Country Park was designated on 18 August 1978.

An extension to the park, called Lantau North (Extension) Country Park, was conceived in 1993. In 1999, the government announced an expansion of the country park area on Lantau Island. The extension was officially designated on 7 November 2008.

Features
Highlights of the park include:

 Wong Lung Hang Country Trail
 Tung Chung Fort
 Tai Tung Shan (Sunset Peak)
 Yi Tung Shan
 Lin Fa Shan 766m
 Lo Fu Tau 465m
 Three Towers

References

External links

Lantau North Country Park
 Map of Lantau North (Extension) Country Park

1978 establishments in Hong Kong
Country parks and special areas of Hong Kong
Lantau Island